McDowell is an unincorporated community in Barry County, in the U.S. state of Missouri.

The community is on Missouri Route VV 4.5 miles south of Pleasant Ridge. Missouri Route C passes the south side of the community along Little Flat Creek. Purdy is seven miles to the west along Route C.

History
A post office called McDowell was established in 1858, and remained in operation until 1925. The community's name honors the local McDowell family.

References

Unincorporated communities in Barry County, Missouri
Unincorporated communities in Missouri